Frank Hughes may refer to:

 Frank Hughes (ice hockey) (born 1949), Canadian ice hockey player
 Frank Hughes (artist) (1905–1987), British artist
 Frank Hughes (athlete) (1908–?), Canadian long-distance runner
 Frank Hughes (sport shooter) (1881–1942), American sport shooter
 Frank Hughes (footballer, born 1909) (1909–2002), Australian rules footballer
 Frank Hughes Jr. (1921–2008), Australian rules footballer
 Frank Hughes (footballer, born 1894) (1894–1978), nicknamed Checker, Australian rules footballer
 Frank E. Hughes (1893–1947), American set decorator
 Frank John Hughes (born 1967), American actor
 Frank Joseph Hughes (1883–1967), Canadian lawyer
 Frank Hughes College, Clifton, Tennessee

See also
 Francis Hughes (1956–1981), volunteer in the IRA who died in the 1981 Irish hunger strike
 Francis Wade Hughes (1817–1885), Pennsylvania lawyer and politician